The 2006–07 WRU Division One East or 2006–07 Asda Division One East for sponsorship reasons was the twelfth season of the WRU Division One and the  first season of the WRU Division One East. The season began on Saturday 2 September 2006 and ended on Saturday 5 April 2007. Twelve teams played each other on a home and away basis. This was also the last season where teams earned three points for a win and one point for a draw.

Table

Results

Matchday 1

Matchday 2

Matchday 3

Matchday 4

Matchday 5

Matchday 6

Matchday 7

Matchday 8 (5/6)

Matchday 9 (4/6)

Matchday 10

Matchday 11

Matchday 12 (3/6)

Matchday 13 (3/6)

Matchday 14 (4/6)

Matchday 15 (4/6)

Matchday 16 (4/6)

Matchday 17 (1/6)

Matchday 18

Matchday 19 (5/6)

Matchday 13 (5/6)

Matchday 17 (4/6)

Matchday 13 (6/6)

Matchday 19 (6/6)

Matchday 20

Matchday 21

Matchday 16 (5/6)

Matchday 22

Mixed matchdays

Mixed matchdays

Mixed matchdays

Mixed matchdays

Division One East
Wales Cup1